The University of New England (UNE) is a public university in Australia with approximately 22,500 higher education students. Its original and main campus is located in the city of Armidale in northern central New South Wales. UNE was the first Australian university established outside a state capital city.

Each year, the university offers students more than $5 million in scholarships, prizes, and bursaries and more than $18 million for staff and students involved in research.

In the 2019 Student Experience Survey, UNE recorded the sixth-highest student satisfaction rating out of all Australian universities, and the highest student satisfaction rating out of all public universities in New South Wales, with an overall satisfaction rating of 83.2. The university ranks lower in research-based rankings of Australian universities.

History

Establishment
The University of New England was preceded by the New England University College, founded in 1938 as part of the University of Sydney. The college became fully independent as the University of New England in 1954, after the entry into force of the University of New England Act 1953 (NSW). The university established a faculty of education in 1967.

Transition to a network university
The university underwent a major restructuring in 1989 with the University of New England Act 1989 (NSW), transitioning into a network university with multiple locations. These consisted of a campus at Armidale, which incorporated the former University of New England and the Armidale College of Advanced Education; and a campus at Lismore, incorporating the former Northern Rivers College of Advanced Education.

In 1990, the Orange Agricultural College joined the university. The network also included the UNE-Coffs Harbour Centre, which provided courses from within academic departments of the Armidale and Lismore campuses.

Return to campus format
In November 1993, the University of New England was re-formed once again, with the passage of the University of New England Act 1993 (NSW) and the Southern Cross University Act 1993 (NSW) through the New South Wales Parliament. This legislation had the effect of dismantling the network university. The University of New England from 1994 has only one campus, at Armidale. A new university (Southern Cross University) was created with campuses in Lismore and Coffs Harbour; the Orange campus was amalgamated with the University of Sydney.

The amalgamation of the former Armidale College of Advanced Education was complete by the time of the new legislation. In the same year, a law school was established.

2020s
In 2020, the University of New England was impacted by the COVID-19 pandemic. Early in the year, the university became a potential exposure site, and students and faculty underwent viral tests. In September of that year, a staff restructuring was announced, with the goal of saving $20 million annually in wage costs and preparing the university for future opportunities, at the expense of 100 positions.

Campus
The University of New England is on several sites in Armidale. The northern campus is five kilometres to the northwest of the city centre, in a rural and bushland setting. Part of this campus includes the original property presented by T R Forster to the University of Sydney for the establishment of a University College. This property comprised the old homestead, 'Booloominbah', with several other buildings and 74 hectares of land. Since the original gift, other generous benefactors have presented properties to the university, whose Armidale site now comprises some 260 hectares.

Booloominbah and the vice-chancellor's residence Trevenna were designed by architect John Horbury Hunt.

The Newling campus of the university includes the Newling Centre, home to the New England Conservatorium of Music, and other buildings associated with the former Armidale College of Advanced Education.

The university possesses rural properties close to the campus, providing facilities for teaching and research. In addition, there are the 'Tullimba' rural research property at Kingstown and the Douglas McMaster Rural Research Station at Warialda.

The University of New England has one of the most extensive residential college systems in Australia. Around half of UNE's on campus students live in one of the colleges.

In 2020, the university revealed plans to construct a campus in Tamworth by 2031.

Research

UNE undertakes fundamental and applied research in many disciplines. Its scholars and scientists have established international reputations through their contributions in areas such as rural science, agricultural economics, educational administration, linguistics and archaeology. Collaborative research with other institutions includes projects with the CSIRO and the high-profile Cooperative Research Centres. Through its research UNE seeks to assist in the economic, social and cultural advancement of Australia and in the advanced training of undergraduate and postgraduate students.

UNE's principal research flagship is animal genetics and livestock breeding, which is serviced by the Animal Genetics and Breeding Unit (AGBU) and delivered commercially by the Agricultural Business Research Institute (ABRI).

Other research flagships include: Rural Education which is undertaken by the National Centre of Science, Information and Communication Technology, and Mathematics Education for Rural and Regional Australia (SiMERR)
Rural Communities, Landscapes and Practices which is led by the Institute for Rural Futures (IRF).

Other targeted areas of research include:
 Environmental and Agricultural Change: Climate Change Adaptation and Mitigation; Marine and Freshwater Biodiversity; Terrestrial Biodiversity; Natural Resource Management; Rural Futures; Australian Fauna; Vegetation Research; Sustainable Agriculture; Agricultural Genetics; Animal Research
 Rural Health: Rural Medicine; Health Services Management; Bioactive Materials; Health Psychology; Gender, Health and Sexuality
 Rural and Regional Education: School Science and Mathematics Education; School English and Literacy Education; Special Education and Diversity in Schools
 Economics and Public Policy: Agricultural Economics; Applied Economics and Policy; Local Government; Business and Management; Higher Education Management and Policy
 Asia Pacific Region : Failing States – Rising States; Empowering People, Developing Infrastructure; Conflict and Governance; Peace Studies; Migration
 Frontiers and Boundaries: Australia's Regional Frontiers; The Arts, Media, Culture and Society; Ancient Societies; Language and Cognition; Believing and Thinking; Mathematics, Nonlinear and Complex Analysis
 Law: Natural Resources Law and Policy; Law and Institutional Arrangements for Rural Communities
 Security: Crime, Criminology and Justice; Biosecurity; IT Security
 Water Perspectives: Water through History – Water Stories; Water Policy; Water Resources

Academic faculties
The research and teaching staff of the University of New England, Australia, is divided into three faculties that together contain nine multi-disciplinary schools.

Faculty of Humanities, Arts, Social Sciences and Education
School of Humanities, Arts and Social Sciences
School of Education
Faculty of Science, Agriculture, Business and Law
School of Environmental and Rural Science
School of Science and Technology
School of Law
UNE Business School
Faculty of Medicine and Health
School of Health
School of Psychology
School of Rural Medicine

The university offers over 200 programs in 23 discipline areas.

Residential colleges
The University of New England has one of the most extensive residential college systems in Australia. Around half of UNE's on-campus students live in one of the colleges.

As at 2019, the residential colleges are:

 Austin College
 Duval College
 Earle Page College
 Mary White College
 Robb College
 St. Albert's College
 Wright College & Village
 Drummond and Smith College

Administration

The current Chancellor is James Harris FRSN, who succeeded John Watkins in 2014. Brigid Heywood succeeded Annabelle Duncan as Vice-Chancellor in July 2019. However, Heywood resigned in August 2022 after criminal charges were laid against her. UNE’s Deputy Vice-Chancellor Professor Simon Evans is currently acting in the Vice-Chancellor role until a replacement is found.

Student representation 

UNE's student body began in 1940, and is currently encapsulated by the University of New England Students' Association.

Events

Frank Archibald Memorial Lecture

The Frank Archibald Memorial Lecture Series is named in honour of Frank Archibald, aka "Bubba", an Aboriginal man who was born in Oban, near Guyra, around 1885 and died on 18 October 1975, aged an estimated 106 years old. He was the eldest grandson of "King Robert" (aka "King Bobby", "King Malawangi", "King Billy" or Robert/Billy/Bobby King), whose photo hangs in the Armidale Museum.

As a revered Elder, Archibald could speak seven different Aboriginal languages and understand another two, as well as speaking English. His surname derives from his Scottish father. He was of the Gumbangeri people on his mother's side, but was also initiated into his wife Sarah Morris's people, the Dhungatti nation. A Catholic priest, Father Kelly, helped Archibald to build a house, completed in 1957, in which many relatives came to live. Archibald was revered by the Armidale Koori and community for his knowledge of so many Aboriginal issues, particularly in the education of his people and others.

The Frank Archibald Memorial Lecture was founded by Lynette Riley, with the inaugural lecture given in 1986 by Eric Willmot. Since then, speakers have included:

Charles Perkins (1990)
Mick Dodson (1994)
Linda Burney (1996)
Pat O'Shane (1998)
Jackie Huggins (2001)
Aden Ridgeway (2004)
Lou Bennett (2018)
Ken Wyatt (2019)
Michelle Trudgett (2020)
Peter Anderson (2022)

Controversy

According to a 2017 Australian Human Rights Commission report based on optional surveys given to students, UNE had the highest reported rate of sexual assaults at universities in Australia, with 4% of respondents saying they had been sexually assaulted; the average rate across all universities was 1.6%. Under a previous 2016 freedom of information request UNE had reported there were 22 officially reported cases of sexual assaults on campus over the previous five years, resulting in two expulsions, no suspensions and seven warnings. In February 2017 vice-chancellor Annabelle Duncan said that past UNE policies dealing with sexual harassment did not allow management to handle some cases satisfactorily.

On 1 August 2022, the incumbent Vice-Chancellor, Professor Brigid Heywood, was charged with allegedly assaulting a teenage girl at a club in Armidale on 8 March. Heywood was issued with an attendance notice to appear at Armidale Local Court on 26 September. On 5 August, UNE accepted her resignation.

Alumni

, more than 106,000 people hold qualifications from UNE, with many in senior positions in Australia and overseas. There is an active alumni network which contributes to the university, enabling the institution to continue expanding its work and offerings.

See also

List of universities in Australia
University of New England Students' Association
TUNE! FM
SiMERR
QuickSmart

References

External links
University of New England

 
Universities in New South Wales
University of New England
Educational institutions established in 1938
1938 establishments in Australia
Armidale